Syagrus adrarensis is a species of leaf beetle from Algeria, described by Maurice Pic in 1942.

References

Eumolpinae
Beetles of North Africa
Beetles described in 1942
Taxa named by Maurice Pic